Badamuiyeh (also Romanized as Bādāmū’īyeh; also known as Badāmān) is a village in Horjand Rural District, Kuhsaran District, Ravar County, Kerman Province, Iran. At the 2006 census, its population was 189, in 51 families.

References 

Populated places in Ravar County